The International Fiscal Association (IFA) was established in 1938 as the only non-governmental and non-sectoral international organisation dealing with fiscal matters. Its headquarters are in the Netherlands. The objects of IFA are the study and advancement of international and comparative law in regard to public finance, specifically international and comparative fiscal law and the financial and economic aspects of taxation.

IFA hosts annual congresses  and produces scientific publications relating to subjects chosen as the main topics of each congress. The subjects chosen for the congresses are chosen in the interest of developing international tax policy and norms. Each subsequent report presented at each congress consists of a country-by-country report on the international tax topics chosen.

Membership of IFA is around 13,500, representing 118 countries, 72 of which have individual IFA Branches that conduct their own events in addition to feeding to the broader IFA Central based at the headquarters. Membership includes an array of individuals who play a role in fiscal policy work and development such as academics, tax practitioners, and government officials.

Along with the increasing internationalization of the world's economies, international tax issues have become more numerous and of greater importance. IFA has played a role both in the development of certain principles of international taxation and in providing possible solutions to problems arising in their practical implementation since the end of the Second World War.

IFA's governance structure is two-fold, with an executive board managing the day-to-day activities of the organisation, and with a general council to look towards long-term goals. The current president of IFA, chairing both the executive board and the general council, is M. Clayson. The secretary general is Jean-Blaise Eckert.

References

External links
International Fiscal Association Home Page
Young IFA Network (YIN)

Tax organizations